Jane Slaughter (born January 9, 1949) is an American journalist who writes frequently on labor affairs. Her writing has appeared in The Nation, The Progressive, Monthly Review, and In These Times. She is based in Detroit.

Background 
Jane Slaughter was born in Scott Depot, West Virginia in 1949. She moved to Washington, D.C. to study at American University. There, she became a member of the New American Movement, and later a member of the October League. She later joined the International Socialists and moved to Detroit to work in telecommunications. Shortly thereafter, she left her job to join the UAW at Chrysler, where she worked for several years. While working at Chrysler, she worked on the UAW's union newspaper. Finding the work enjoyable, she went on to co-found the labor magazine Labor Notes, where she was an editor until retiring in 2014. She still occasionally writes articles for the magazine.

Slaughter is the author of Concessions and How to Beat Them and co-author, with Mike Parker, of Choosing Sides: Unions and the Team Concept and Working Smart: A Union Guide to Participation Programs and Reengineering.  She is also the editor of Troublemaker's Handbook 2. Additionally, she co-wrote Secrets of a Successful Organizer with Alexandra Bradbury and Mark Brenner. She is a member of the Democratic Socialists of America.

References

1949 births
Living people
American women journalists
Members of the Democratic Socialists of America
20th-century American journalists
20th-century American women
21st-century American women